MK Group (Serbian Cyrillic: МК Група) is a Serbian holding company which operates in the agriculture, banking, and tourism sector. The company was established in 1983, and has since expanded its business operations across South East Europe with a special focus on 4 countries in the region: Serbia, Slovenia, Croatia and Montenegro.

History

In 1983, Serbian economist and businessman Miodrag Kostić began a private business, initially as an owner of a private company for trade, import-export and manufacturing activities. MK Group now operates in several countries: Serbia, Slovenia, Croatia and Montenegro.

Divisions

Agribusiness
Since 2000, MK Group has managed sugar industry factories (factories Pećinci, Vrbas, Kovačica), more than 10 agribusiness enterprises, trade and warehouse complexes ("Granex-port", "Žito Bačka").

Sunoko, a subsidiary of MK Group, is one of the leading companies in sugar production both in Serbia and the region. In 2011, MK Group took over "Carnex" company (established in 1958), which produces meat and meat products. In December 2015, MK Group took over PIK-Bečej for a sum of 45.5 million euros.

One of the most notable subsidiary companies are Carnex Vrbas (meat industry), Sunoko (sugar industry), Agroglobe (fertilizing and wholesale of agriculture products), PIK-Bečej (agribusiness) and others. Most of its agribusiness is concentrated on the production and wholesale of the cereals – corn, wheat, sunflower and soybeans. As of January 2016, MK Group manages around 29,000 hectares of agriculture land (around 290 square kilometers) in Serbia, of which it owns around 19,000 hectares.

From 2006 to 2017, it operated in Ukraine through Agro-Invest Ukraine, agribusiness company specialized in sunflower production and wholesale. As of January 2016, Agro-Invest Ukraine managed nearly 30,000 hectares of agriculture land (around 300 square kilometers) in Ukraine. In May 2017, Kernel Holding bought majority of its shares.

In June 2020, MK Group completed the process of acquisition of 67% of the shares of Victoria Group. With the integration of Victoria Group member companies, Sojaprotein, Victoria Oil, Victoria Logistic, Luka Bačka Palanka and VZS Stočna hrana, MK Group has acquired the status of majority owner, while the previous shareholders Milija Babović and Apsara Limited have remained minority owners. The company was sold in November 2021 to ADM Europe.

Banking
MK Group, through its subsidiary company MK Commerce, founded BDD M&V Investments brokerage firm which operates on the Belgrade Stock Exchange. However, BDD M&V Investments with its subsidiaries is not a part of the holding. M&V Investments controls a large ownership share of AIK Banka (since 2014), which later acquired and integrated another Serbian bank Jubanka in 2017. As of 31 December 2017, AIK banka has total assets of 1.767 billion euros.

Also, as of December 2017, AIK Banka is a majority shareholder with 75.99% of the Slovenian bank Gorenjska banka. As of December 2017, Gorenjska banka controls 4.7% of Slovenian banking market share. In June 2019, AIK Banka fully took over the ownership of Gorenjska banka and thus successfully completed the takeover process in Slovenia.

Energy
Apart from real estate, MK Group has invested in developing renewable energy sources, whereby MK Fintel Wind, established in 2007, is one of the first companies in Serbia that have started green energy production using the wind-powered generators and solar panels.

Real estate
MK Group also manages several real estate properties through its subsidiaries like "MK Mountain Resort".

In December 2008, MK Group bought from "Internacional CG" the Kopaonik-based hotels "Grand" and "Sunčani vrhovi" and other real estate properties for a sum of 23 million euros.

Under auspices of "MK Mountain Resort" are the hotels "Grand" and "Angella" as well as the apartment complex "Konaci" and "Sunčani vrhovi" (all located on the Mountain Kopaonik). Hotel "Grand" is a home venue for the Serbian annual business conference Kopaonik Business Forum. Also, "Kempinski Palace" hotel in Portorož is operated by the MK Group. MK Group cooperates with world's famous hotel group Kempinski, and has invested in several real estate properties in Serbia and region. It also cooperates with another hotel group Sheraton Hotels and Resorts, and has invested in hotel located in Novi Sad.

In November 2017, "Istrian hotels", a subsidiary of MK Group, took over "Skiper Resort" hotel complex located in Istria. In February 2018, MK Group increased its ownership stake in the third largest Slovenian civil airport Portorož and is today the majority stake holder.

In June 2020, MK Group acquired the Slovenian branch of Heta Asset Resolution. At the end of 2019, MK Group was selected as the best bidder in the tender, and with the official approval of the Public Agency of the Republic of Slovenia for Protection of Competition and the approvals of the Competition Protection Commissions of Serbia and Montenegro, formal requests for payment and purchase were met.

Social responsibility
In the last five years, the company conducted more than 500 socially responsible actions worth over €5,000,000 with the intention of improving the living and working conditions in 123 local communities in which MK Group operate.

MK Group's responsible activities are primarily focused on health and education of children and young people.

Awards
This is a list of awards that the company has received over the years:
 1998 – MK Commerce was chosen as The best private company in Serbia
 2001 – MK Commerce – The best private company in Serbia
 2002 – Letter of Appreciation to the company MK Commerce for its contribution to the construction of the Memorial Temple of Saint Sava at the Vračar plateau
 2004 – MK Commerce, one of the best ranked on the list of the best private companies and the most popular citizen of Novi Sad
 2007 – Plaquettes Gold partner to the company MK Commerce
 2009 – Letter of Appreciation to MK Group from Politika JSC and the Ministry of Education of the Republic of Serbia for a donation in the campaign for honoring the elementary and high school students in Serbia
 2011 – "Gold Dinar of Emperor Dušan" Award of the Club of Economic Journalists to the company MK Group for the company of the decade in Serbia
 2012 – Award of the Novi Sad Fair for the "Best in Agribusiness" to the company MK Group for The best regional company in the field of agriculture
 2012 – B92 Fund's "Hero Company" Medal to MK Group for donating funds to humanitarian action "Struggle for Babies"
 2012 – Letter of Appreciation of SOS Children's Village Kraljevo to the company MK Group for building the Youth House
 2012 – Plaquettes OSSI for supporting Serbian students abroad
 2013 – "Best in Agribusiness" Award of the Novi Sad Fair to MK Group for The best regional company in the field of agriculture
 2013 – "My Choice" Award for the most socially responsible company in Serbia to MK Group for the project SOS Children's Village – the Youth House
 2013 – "Superbrands" Awards to the company MK Group
 2013 – "The Corporate Super Brand" Award for the leader in mountain tourism in Serbia
 2014 – The "Brand Leader Award" to MK Mountain Resort, at the 4th Business Conference "Sustainable Development and Competitiveness of Tourism in South East Europe – SEET 2014"
 2014 – "Superbrands" Award for the best brand in Serbia to Carnex
 2015 – "The Best Corporate  Brand in Food Production" to Carnex
 2015 – "Business partner 2015" Award for providing the best banking services to AIK Bank
 2016 – "Superbrands" Awards to MK Commerce, MK Mountain Resort and Carnex
 2016 – Sunoko received "The Best from Serbia" Award for the best corporate brand in the category of daily consumer goods from the Serbian Chamber of Commerce in cooperation with the Ministry of Trade, Tourism and Telecommunications
 2016 and 2017 – PIK Bečej Champion in the category In-calf Heifer Holstein, Friesian Breed at the International Agricultural Fair in Novi Sad
 2017 – Grand Hotel & Spa was received "The Best from Serbia" Award from the Serbian Chamber of Commerce in the hotel category
 2017 – Iskon edible sunflower oil received the prestigious "Superior Taste Award" for the second consecutive year, awarded by the International Taste & Quality Institute, and is a multi-annual winner of the Grand Gold Medal for Quality at the International Agricultural Fair in Novi Sad
 2018 – Carnex was presented with the gold medal at World Food Moscow at Prodexpo in Moscow
 2018 – Grand Hotel & Spa was pronounced the best in Serbia by Superbrands Serbia
 2018 – For the fourth year in a row, AIK Bank received an award for the best commercial bank in Serbia from the renowned international magazine International Banker
 2014 – 2019 Agroglobe received five consecutive annual awards for the largest exporter of grains and oilseeds from Serbia by Žita Srbije at the International Fair of Agriculture in Novi Sad
 2008 – 2019 Sunoko has been a regular winner of the Great Gold Cup for consistently high quality sugar, and has won dozens of gold and silver medals awarded by the International Fair of Agriculture in Novi Sad
 2019 – Miodrag Kostić won the Golden Sign Award of the Red Cross of Serbia for exceptional humanitarian work
 2019 – MK Group was presented with the prestigious Serbian Chamber of Commerce "Friend of the Family" Award
 2019 – Hotel Kempinski Palace Portorož won the Star Diamond Award of the American Academy of Hospitality Sciences, as well as the World Travel Tourism Awards (WTA) as the leading Slovenian hotel
 2019 – Sheraton Hotel is being awarded with a Silver Champion Cup of the Novi Sad Fair for exceptional quality of hospitality services and with ten gold medals in different categories
 2019 – The company Agrounija was presented with the "Special Contribution to the Development of the Regional Economy Award", awarded by the Serbian Chamber of Commerce, RCC Sremska Mitrovica
 2019 – For the fifth consecutive year, AIK Bank has been recognized as the Best Commercial Bank in Serbia by the renowned economic magazine International Banker. Also, it has been awarded in the category of the most innovative banks in the retail sector
 2019 – Sheraton Hotel was presented with the "Ambassador of Good Service Award", sponsored by the Ministry of Trade, Tourism and Telecommunications of the Republic of Serbia, in the category "The most successful hotel team of the Hotel Rooms Division"

See also
 Agriculture in Serbia

References

Agriculture companies of Serbia
Companies based in Belgrade
Conglomerate companies of Serbia
D.o.o. companies in Serbia
Holding companies established in 1995
Holding companies of Serbia
Serbian companies established in 1995